The Carrowkennedy ambush was an ambush carried out by the Irish Republican Army (IRA) on 2 June 1921, during the Irish War of Independence. An IRA flying column, commanded by Michael Kilroy, ambushed a mobile patrol of the Royal Irish Constabulary including Black and Tans recruits  at Carrowkennedy, near Westport, County Mayo. It resulted in the deaths of eight of the RIC, including some who were killed by their own rifle grenade. After two hours the RIC surrendered and their weaponry and ammunition were seized by the IRA.

Preparation
On Thursday 2 June, the West Mayo flying column was based in the townland of Claddy, near the road from Westport to Leenaun. In the mid-afternoon, O/C Michael Kilroy was informed that an RIC patrol including two Crossley Tender lorries and a Ford car had stopped at the rural area of Carrowkennedy. The IRA had blocked the road with trenches, which the RIC got local men cutting turf to fill in. Kilroy knew that the patrol would have to return the same way as his men had destroyed Erriff Bridge. The 45–50 IRA volunteers were divided into three sections and subdivided into small units of six men under the command of a more experienced officer. The Westport men, led by Vice-Brigadier Brodie Malone, formed one section. They were placed on high ground 120 yards from the road. They were behind a stone wall and removed stones to form firing positions. The second section was formed mainly of Newport men.  They were positioned further west, from the end of the first section's position along a wood to the main road.  The third section, from Louisburgh, crossed the road to hold a hill above the junction to Drummin.  The sections were to hold fire until all the vehicles were in range of the whole column. Kilroy had learned from the failed ambush at Kilmeena.  He handpicked snipers to kill the drivers of both Crossley Tenders.  He also assigned men to watch any machine gunners.

On discovering the Erriff Bridge destroyed, the patrol went to Darby Hastings Pub for refreshments. The patrol then headed back towards Westport. The Ford car broke down and was being towed by the second lorry as they drove back through Carrowkennedy.  Gus Delahunty, a civilian from Westport, was ordered to drive his own car as part of the patrol. The patrol was commanded by District Inspector (DI) Edward Stevenson, an ex Army officer in the Black Watch from County Down, who had joined the RIC in July 1920 and been promoted to DI in October of that year. Contrary to regulations, he was driving the first lorry, when he should have been in the back of the second lorry with his men. This increased his risk and separated him from his men.

Ambush
At 6:30 PM an IRA scout signalled the approach of the patrol.  Jimmy O'Flaherty, a former Connaught Ranger, lined up his rifle sights on DI Stevenson in the lead vehicle, killing him with a shot to the head.  The lorry lurched forward, stopped in the middle of the road and came under heavy fire from the IRA above. The RIC men quickly tumbled out and got down behind a bank which gave them some cover. They took out a Lewis gun and trained it on the third section of IRA men. After two short bursts of fire, the gunner lay dead beside his gun.  A second gunner fired a burst from the Lewis in the direction of the third section, then he swung the muzzle in the air to protect himself from the riflemen above. This was unsuccessful and he too fell dead beneath the gun. Three men in all died trying to use the gun, according to Michael Kilroy. Four men in the lorry were now dead: DI Stevenson and Constables Sydney Blythe, James Brown and John Doherty. The remaining men in the lorry were led by Sergeant Creegan, an Irishman. They attached a rifle grenade launcher to a Lee–Enfield rifle and launched grenades towards the IRA to keep them at bay.

The second lorry was stopped by rifle fire from both sides of the road as soon as shots were heard from the direction of the first lorry, killing the second driver. This lorry coasted to the ditch at the side of the road. After a while the RIC men ran into a thatched cottage facing onto the road. They poked rifles through the front windows and through a window high in the gable which looked down on the Westport road. They needlessly used up a lot of ammunition and then realized that they had left their spare ammunition in the lorry. They unsuccessfully tried to persuade the householder and her young son to fetch the ammunition.

The motor car was some distance behind the second lorry and stopped beyond the cottage. Three RIC men jumped off the exposed side and two remained on the sheltered side of the road which had a thicket beside it next to the cottage.  One of the RIC men advanced towards the IRA position but was badly wounded.

Two hours went by. Michael Kilroy was worried that if the first lorry did not surrender soon, the column might not have time to concentrate on the RIC men in the cottage. Enemy reinforcements could arrive from Westport, Castlebar or Ballinrobe, by road or over the hills to the east. A fresh assault on the lorry was made by IRA volunteers Johnny Duffy and Tommy Heavey, who had bayonets.  A rifle grenade which was being hurled by the RIC fell back into the lorry and exploded, killing the man who threw it and fatally wounding others beside him.  A handkerchief was hoisted by Sergeant Creegan on a rifle to surrender.  Only one of the men in the lorry was unhurt.  Sergeant Creegan was fatally wounded in the legs and abdomen. A door borrowed from a nearby house was used as a stretcher for the badly wounded Creegan.  Being both Irish policemen the householder prepared a drink for Creegan and the other wounded constable Cullen who remained outside as it was warm.

With the captured Lewis gun, IRA volunteer O'Flaherty then fired on the occupied cottage from a covered position.  The men inside came out with their hands above their heads.

The IRA captured 22 rifles, eight drums for the Lewis gun, several boxes of grenades, 21 revolvers, and about 6000 rounds of rifle ammunition. The IRA then poured petrol over the two lorries and the car and set them ablaze.

Eight of the RIC patrol were killed outright or died of their wounds, and 16 surrendered. Of the RIC dead, three, John Doherty, of Roscommon, Francis Creegan of Fermanagh and Thomas Dowling of Laois were 'old RIC' constables (having joined the force respectively in 1896 and 1900), while the other five were 'Black and Tans', that is war veterans, all except DI Stevenson from Britain, who had joined the RIC in 1920 or 1921. The Black and Tans who surrendered were not killed, even though this policy had been endorsed by IRA General Headquarters. Many of the local people went into hiding to avoid the retribution of the Black and Tans. The IRA volunteers evaded capture by sheltering in safe houses.

See also
Kilmichael ambush
Timeline of the Irish War of Independence

References

Military actions and engagements during the Irish War of Independence
1921 in Ireland
History of County Mayo
Royal Irish Constabulary
June 1921 events
Ambushes in Europe